The Dawn of the Black Hearts (subtitled  Live in Sarpsborg, Norway 28/2, 1990) is a bootleg live album by the Norwegian black metal band Mayhem. The title originates from a line of lyrics Fenriz of Darkthrone wrote for the band.

Despite being a bootleg, the album is sometimes erroneously listed as one of the band's main albums, mainly due to the notoriety regarding the cover art, which is an image of the late Mayhem vocalist Per "Dead" Ohlin shortly after he committed suicide.

Background 
The bootleg is a recording of a live show that took place on 28 February 1990 in Sarpsborg, Norway. Metalion, an early figure in the scene who helped to organise this show, claimed that there were around 300 people in attendance and the members of Darkthrone and Immortal were present as well.

Cover 

The album is infamous and controversial for bearing a photograph of vocalist Dead (Per Yngve Ohlin), shortly after his suicide on 8 April 1991. The photograph was taken by guitarist Euronymous (Øystein Aarseth), shortly after he entered the house the band shared and discovered the body.

Bullmetal, a penpal of Euronymous and owner of Warmaster Records, was sent a copy of one of the photos Euronymous had taken of Dead's body. Euronymous had taken additional pictures of Dead's body in different positions (one of them with Dead "sitting half up, with the shotgun on his knee"), but these photos were later found and destroyed by Euronymous's father after he was killed in 1993, two years before the album bootleg was released.

Release 
According to Metalion, the bootleg was made and released by an individual from South America. This individual has been identified as Mauricio “Bull Metal” Montoya from the Colombian metal scene, who was apparently a pen-pal of Euronymous. The latter is said to have given Bull Metal the photographs, which were used for the first printings of the bootleg in South America. However, some of these details are considered more mythical than substantiated.

Dayal Patterson, a historian of metal, has referred to the live record as "perhaps the most bootlegged black metal release of all time." The bootleg was the gateway to discovering Dead-era Mayhem for a number of later black metal musicians, such as Black Emperor of Spain's Supremacía Satánica, D of Indonesia's , and Semjaza of Greece's Thy Darkened Shade.

The Dawn of the Black Hearts was officially reissued in 2017 on vinyl under the name Live in Sarpsborg, using a photo of Necrobutcher as a new cover. This 2017 release uses improved audio from a separate master source recording of the concert.

Track listing 
The original track listing (recorded in 1990 with Dead as vocalist and Hellhammer as drummer):

Extra songs included on many reissues (recorded in 1985 with Messiah as vocalist and Manheim as drummer):

Personnel 
Lineup on original release:
 Dead (Per Yngve Ohlin) – vocals
 Euronymous (Øystein Aarseth) – guitar
 Necrobutcher (Jørn Stubberud) – bass 
 Hellhammer (Jan Axel Blomberg) – drums

Re-release bonus tracks lineup:
 Messiah (Eirik Nordheim) – vocals
 Euronymous (Øystein Aarseth) – guitar
 Necrobutcher (Jørn Stubberud) – bass 
 Manheim (Kjetil Manheim) – drums

See also 
 Mayhem discography

References

Notes

Citations

External links 
 The Dawn of the Black Hearts on discogs.com
 The Dawn of the Black Hearts on the official Mayhem website

Mayhem (band) albums
Bootleg recordings
1995 live albums
Obscenity controversies in music